Herbert Richers  (March 11, 1923 – November 20, 2009) was a Brazilian film and dubbing producer. He was a pioneer in the field of voice-overs in Brazil and was responsible for the dubbing of many Hollywood blockbusters into Portuguese, particularly action films such as the Rambo, Rocky, and Lethal Weapon series of films, popular US TV series such as Charlie's Angels, Buffy the Vampire Slayer, CSI: Miami, The Fresh Prince of Bel-Air and Friends and many cartoon series including Popeye and Scooby-Doo. He also produced over 55 Brazilian films between 1956 (Com Água na Boca) and 1975 and was also active with telenovelas like Rosa salvaje.

Career
Based in Rio de Janeiro since 1942,  eight years later he founded Herbert Richers SA, which started in the business of film distribution.

The company was one of the pioneers of dubbing in Brazil. Today is one of the largest companies in the industry in the country, with an average of 150 hours of dubbed movies per month, representing 70% of the films run in Brazilian theaters. It also has the largest dubbing studios in Latin America occupying more than 10 thousand square meters.

Herbert Richers was a film producer of former productions in the 1950s.

Aware of the Hollywood studios, he was connected to Walt Disney Studios which educated him in dubbing. Bringing the knowledge gained there back to Brazil, he applied it to the movies  and TV productions in Brazil. He thus dubbed many Hollywood films and TV series into Portuguese for the Brazilian audience, particularly blockbuster action movies and television series (see below).

Personal life and death
He died on November 20, 2009 from kidney failure. His son, Herbert Richers Jr., is also a noted director in Brazil.

Selected filmography

Telenovelas
Alegrifes e Rabujos
Amigas e Rivais
Amor a Mil por Hora
Amor Real
A Outra
A Feia Mais Bela
A Usurpadora
Café com Aroma de Mulher
Carinha de Anjo
Carrossel (telenovela)
Viva às Crianças! – Carrossel 2
Chiquititas 2006
Chiquititas 2007
Chiquititas 2008
Código Postal
Cúmplices de um Resgate
No Limite da Paixão
Esmeralda
Lalola
Luz Clarita
Marimar
María Mercedes
Maria do Bairro
O Diário de Daniela
O Privilégio de Amar
Pícara Sonhadora
Os Ricos Também Choram
Primeiro Amor … A Mil por Hora
Quase Anjos
Quinze Anos
Rebelde
Rosalinda
Rosa salvaje

Cartoons
Animaniacs
A Ratinha Valente (original dub)
As Aventuras de Tintin
As Peripécias de um Ratinho Detetive
As Tartarugas Ninja
Bicrossers
Capitão Planeta
Caverna do Dragão
Centurions
Chaves em Desenho Animado
Danny Phantom (also dubbed by Delart)
Dennis, o Pimentinha
Digimon, Digimon 02 e Digimon Tamers
Ducktales
Em Busca do Vale Encantado
Fievel: Um Conto Americano
Galaxy Rangers
Hamtaro
He-Man
Inspetor Bugiganga (redubbed version)
Johnny Bravo (seasons 2, 3 and 4)
Larryboy: The Cartoon Adventures
Nossa Turma
O Caldeirão Mágico
O Cão e a Raposa
O Ônibus Mágico (seasons 1 and 2)
O Novo Show do Pica-Pau
Os Caça Fantasmas
Os Dinossauros Voltaram
Os Vegetais (TV dub)
Mirmo Zibang
Pole Position
Popeye
Primo Cruzado
Pucca
Rover Dangerfield: Uma Vida de Cachorro
Scooby-Doo, Cadê Você?, Scooby-Doo e Scooby-Loo, O Pequeno Scooby-DooShaiderShe-raSilverhawksSuperamigosTenchi MuyoThundercatsTonde BurinTico e Teco e os Defensores da LeiTom e Jerry: O Filme (TV dub version)Um Conto Americano: Fievel Vai Para o OesteTelevision seriesALF, o ETeimosoA Gata e o RatoAgente 86As PanterasBarrados no BaileBuffy a Caça-VampirosCapitão MarvelCasal 20CSI: MiamiCSI: NYDallasFamília DinossaurosFriendsKenan & KelLois & Clark: As Novas Aventuras do SupermanMagnum, P.I.Miami ViceMonk – Um Detetive DiferenteOs GatõesO Incrível HulkOs PioneirosOs TroopersPower RangersProfissão: PerigoTrês é DemaisUm Maluco no PedaçoFilmsAdvogado do Diabo (1997)
A História Sem Fim
A Lagoa Azul (1980)Alien – O Oitavo PassageiroÀ procura da felicidadeBom dia, Vietnã! (1988)
Brinquedo Assassino (1988)AssassinosBatman – O FilmeAlta TensãoClube da LutaCoração ValenteDemetrius e os GladiadoresDuro de MatarDuro de Matar 2Em Nome Do PaiE o Vento LevouFree WillyFree Willy 2: A Aventura ContinuaFalcão: O Campeão dos CampeõesGrease – Nos Tempos da BrilhantinaHighlander: O Guerreiro ImortalLetra e MúsicaLiberdade para as borboletasMáquina MortíferaMáquina Mortífera 2Máquina Mortífera 3Máquina Mortífera 4MaverickMeu Primeiro AmorMinority Report: A Nova LeiMortal KombatMorte SúbitaMoulin Rouge!Nova York SitiadaO AlvoO Código da VinciO DemolidorOs Dez MandamentosO EspecialistaO FugitivoO Grande Dragão BrancoO Pequeno PolegarO Poderoso ChefãoO Quinto ElementoO Rapto do Menino DouradoO Último Guerreiro das EstrelasPerigo na NoiteO Vingador do FuturoPower Rangers: O FilmeRambo: Programado para MatarRambo II: A MissãoRambo IIIRisco TotalRocky VSoldado UniversalCobraGuerra nas EstrelasStar Wars Episódio V: O Império Contra-AtacaStar Wars Episódio VI: O Retorno de Jedi SupermanCantando na ChuvaTitanicTurbo: Power Rangers 2U.S. Marshals – Os FederaisUm Tira da PesadaVelocidade MáximaVelocidade Máxima 2Os GooniesTelevision specialsA Rena do Nariz Vermelho'' (1979 dub)

References

External links
 

1923 births
2009 deaths
People from Araraquara
Brazilian film producers
Brazilian male voice actors
Deaths from kidney failure